Abu'l-Barakat al-Husayn ibn Muhammad al-Jarjara'i was a Fatimid official. He was the nephew of the long-serving vizier Ali ibn Ahmad al-Jarjara'i, and became vizier himself in 1048. He held the office for 19 months before being dismissed for his tyrannical behaviour in February 1050 and banished to Tyre.

References

Sources

 
 

11th-century deaths
11th-century Arabs
11th-century people from the Fatimid Caliphate
Year of birth unknown
Viziers of the Fatimid Caliphate